Events from the year 1767 in Ireland.

Incumbent
Monarch: George III

Events
20 July – Arthur Chichester, 5th Earl of Donegall, grants new leases for most of his property holdings in Belfast, obliging tenants to redevelop.
19 August – Viscount Townshend appointed Lord Lieutenant of Ireland (sworn 14 October).
The titles Earl of Howth and Viscount St Lawrence are created in the Peerage of Ireland in favour of Thomas St Lawrence, 15th Baron Howth.
 A Magdalen Asylum was established by Lady Arabella Denny in Leeson Street, for Protestant women.

Arts and literature
Hugh Kelly's novel Memoirs of a Magdalen is published.
John O'Keeffe's first play, The She Gallant, is performed at the Smock Alley Theatre in Dublin.

Births
1 January – Maria Edgeworth, novelist (died 1849).
14 March – Charles Arbuthnot, Tory politician and member of the Privy Council (died 1850).
19 May – Richard Trench, 2nd Earl of Clancarty, diplomat, Irish, and later British, MP (died 1837).
31 August – Henry Joy McCracken, cotton manufacturer and industrialist, Presbyterian and a founding member of the Society of the United Irishmen (died 1798).
21 November – Thomas Russell, co-founder and leader of the United Irishmen, executed for his part in Robert Emmet's rebellion (died 1803).
Full date unknown
John Moore, participant in Irish Rebellion of 1798, proclaimed President of the Government of the Province of Connaught (died 1799).

Deaths
30 November – John Cole, 1st Baron Mountflorence, politician (born 1709).

References

 
Years of the 18th century in Ireland
Ireland
1760s in Ireland